Nguru Airstrip  is an airport serving Nguru in Nigeria. The runway is just northeast of the village of Wazagal.

Current satellite imagery shows the runway overgrown with scrub and brush. Google Earth Historical Imagery shows the runway clear as recently as April 2013.

See also
Transport in Nigeria
List of airports in Nigeria

References

Airports in Nigeria